Oncidium brunleesianum is a species of orchid native to Brazil (Rio de Janeiro).

References

External links 

brunleesianum
Endemic orchids of Brazil
Orchids of Rio de Janeiro (state)